Dorig (formerly called Wetamut) is an Oceanic language spoken on Gaua island in Vanuatu.

The language’s 300 speakers live mostly in the village of Dorig, on the south coast of Gaua. Smaller speaker communities can be found in the villages of Qteon (east coast) and Qtevut (west coast).

Dorig's immediate neighbours are Koro and Mwerlap.

Name
The name Dorig, spelled Dōrig, is derived from the name of the village where it is spoken. The term is related to Dōlav (the Dorig name of a village that is called in Lakon as Jōlap ), with the -rig and -lav parts meaning "small" and "big" respectively. The element dō is obscure; hence the only term that can be reconstructed for Proto-Torres-Banks is *-riɣi.

Phonology
Dorig has 8 phonemic vowels. These include 7 short monophthongs  and one long vowel .

Dorig has 15 consonant phonemes.

The phonotactic template for a syllable in Dorig is:  — e.g.  ‘woman’;  ‘poor’;  ‘octopus’. Remarkably, the consonant clusters of these  syllables are not constrained by the Sonority Sequencing Principle.

Grammar
The system of personal pronouns in Dorig contrasts clusivity, and distinguishes four numbers (singular, dual, trial, plural).

Spatial reference is based on a system of geocentric (absolute) directionals, which is typical of Oceanic languages.

References

Bibliography

 .

External links
 Linguistic map of north Vanuatu, showing range of Dorig on Gaua.
 Audio recordings in Dorig language, in open access, by A. François (source: Pangloss Collection).
 A story in Dorig, with audio recording and translation.

Languages of Vanuatu
Banks–Torres languages
Torba Province
Definitely endangered languages